Adado District is a district in the central Galgaduud region of Somalia. Its capital lies at Adado. The city's population is from the Hiraab, Habar girdir of Hawiye sub-clans.

References

External links
 Districts of Somalia
 Administrative map of Adado District

Districts of Somalia
Galguduud